Bærum Basket, also known as Bærum Basket Bekkestua, is a professional basketball team based in Bærum, Norway, currently participating in the BLNO, Norway's premier basketball league. It is owned by Knut Ola Staver.  The club was founded in the year of 1963 as Bærum Basketball Club, commonly referred to as simply Bærum BBK. Bærum is historically known to be one of the most successful teams in the BLNO, tied with Asker Aliens B.C. for the most league championships. Bærum Basket has won 4 BLNO league championships and 1 Norwegian Cup dating back to the creation of the BLNO league.

Some of the most prominent players that have been with Bærum Basket in recent years include: Stian Mjos, Keith Thompson, and Donald Oatis. These players have all been playing under the coaching of Pal Berg.

History

Establishment 
In the spring of 1963, Jan Petter Hansen— a physical education teacher at Valler Upper Secondary School— initiated the first official basketball club in the entire country of Norway, with the help of the Norwegian Confederation of Sports (NIF). Known as the Bærum Basketball Club, or the Bærum BBK, the club first consisted of eleven players.

Rise of Bærum BBK (1964–1978) 
Bærum BBK earned its first prize in the spring of 1964, the "Fair Play Trophy", an inspiration that would start a whole new era in the entire club's history. Interest in the sport rapidly increased in the Eikeli area of Bærum, giving the team more and more space for young talent on their roster due to the high recruitment rate.

This was also the period of time in which the club was seeing an increase in the number of Americans on the court, helping them win their first ever tournament, in this case the 1966 Coca-Cola Cup. The Coca-Cola Cup was an opening tournament that took place in the fall.

Bærum BBK's first league championship came in mid-1968, a period that is widely considered to be the club's first and greatest triumph. Toppling their chief rivals, OSI, with a score of 59-58, Aftenposten, Norway's largest newspaper, described the game as "the best basketball played in Norway."

Players

Current roster

Depth chart

References

External links 
 Eurobasket.com Baerum Page

Basketball teams in Norway
Sport in Bærum